Gasselterboerveen is a hamlet in the Dutch province of Drenthe. It is a part of the municipality of Aa en Hunze, and lies about 19 km east of Assen.

The statistical area "Gasselterboerveen", which can also include the surrounding countryside, has a population of around 50.

References

Populated places in Drenthe
Aa en Hunze